Jade Smits (born 12 May 2001) is a Belgian backstroke swimmer. She competed in the women's 50 metre backstroke event at the 2020 European Aquatics Championships, in Budapest, Hungary.

References

External links
 

2001 births
Living people
Belgian female backstroke swimmers
Place of birth missing (living people)